Atamanovka is a rural locality (a khutor) in Krinichanskoye Rural Settlement, Rossoshansky District, Voronezh Oblast, Russia. The population was 53 as of 2010. There are 2 streets.

Geography 
Atamanovka is located 58 km southeast of Rossosh (the district's administrative centre) by road. Pervomayskoye is the nearest rural locality.

References 

Rural localities in Rossoshansky District